The Citizens' Political Movement for Bocaya (Movimiento Politico Ciudadanos por Bocaya) is a political party in Colombia. 
At the last legislative elections, held 10 March 2002, the party won as one of the many small parties parliamentary representation. 

Political parties in Colombia